San Rocco is a Renaissance-style, Roman Catholic church located in Nepi, province of Viterbo, region of Lazio, Italy. 

The church was erected in 1467, after the bubonic plague epidemic afflicting the city, and the commune fulfilled a pledge to erect a Chapel to the Saint Roch. The church has 15th century paintings.

References

Churches in the province of Viterbo
Renaissance architecture in Lazio
15th-century Roman Catholic church buildings in Italy
Plague churches